Hypochrosis pyrrhophaeata is a geometer moth in the subfamily Ennominae first described by Francis Walker in 1863. It is found in the north eastern Himalayas and Sundaland. The species is common, often abundant, in lowlands and hill forests up to 2000 m.

External links

Hypochrosini
Moths of Borneo
Moths described in 1863